Núcleo Bandeirante is an administrative region in the Federal District in Brazil.

See also
List of administrative regions of the Federal District

References

External links

 Regional Administration of Núcleo Bandeirante website
 Government of the Federal District website

Administrative regions of Federal District (Brazil)
Populated places established in 1964
1964 establishments in Brazil